Panfilov (Panfilov, Panfilovo) is a selo in Ertis District in Pavlodar Region of northern Kazakhstan. Population:  .

Notable people
Herman Gref (born 1964), politician and businessman

References

Populated places in Pavlodar Region